Kintana is a monotypic moth genus in the subfamily Lymantriinae erected by Paul Griveaud in 1976. Its only species, Kintana ocellatula, was first described by Hering in 1926. It is found on Madagascar.

References

Lymantriinae
Noctuoidea genera
Monotypic moth genera